Dora Carr was an American musician, best known for her work in the early and mid-1920s with pianist and arranger Cow Cow Davenport. Carr is best remembered for the song "Cow Cow Blues" and playing boogie-woogie. Dora Carr was also a vocalist who went on tour in the 1920s performing at venues.

According to Harlem Renaissance Lives (edited by Henry Louis Gates and Evelyn Brooks Higginbotham), Davenport and Carr met in 1922 and toured the Theater Owners Bookers Association as "Davenport and Company". Eight songs were released by Vocalion Records in the vaudevillian duet style. The band broke up when Dora left Davenport for another man, whom she later married.

References

Boogie-woogie pianists
Vocalion Records artists
African-American women singers
Vaudeville performers
Year of birth missing
Year of death missing